is a Japanese pop rock band consisting of two members:  on vocals and  on guitar and bass. Active since 1997, Funta have not released any full-length albums to date, focusing instead on releasing singles for use as theme songs in anime.

Funta's more recent credits have been primarily for the lyrics and composition of anime themes performed by other artists, including Mika Kikuchi, Suitei-Shojo, and Mai Nakahara. Despite the arguably infrequent nature of band activity, the duo are still active; the Official Funta Website is updated regularly by UCO, who keeps diaries on the site for herself as well as for her three dogs.

Musical style
Funta's decidedly upbeat sound, which they describe (with contested accuracy) as synthpop, incorporates elements of techno, ska, pop punk, and industrial rock, occasionally blending these styles together at a relatively frenetic pace within a single composition ("Wake up Angel"), and other times simply adhering to standard pop music conventions ("Mienai Happy"). With such a limited discography, however, it is perhaps UCO's intentionally cute, occasionally munchkin-esque singing style that is the band's most distinguishing characteristic. With upbeat lyrics, babyish vocals, and perhaps even their very existence as a two-member band, the duo exhibits characteristics relatively common of Japanese musical acts commissioned for work in anime and videogame production.

Discography

Soundtrack contributions
Most songs listed below are available on the original soundtracks (OSTs) of their respective Series, usually as televised edits (TV SIZE), and only those songs for which "N/A" does not apply as Type. The singles below are cited for containing the full-length versions of all songs listed, and constitute the entirety of Funta's known body of work.

Other credits

Note: Guitarist Yoshimi is sometimes given composition and/or production credit as Hide.

External links
Funta Official Homepage 

Japanese pop rock music groups
Musical groups established in 1997
Anime musical groups